The 2016–17 season will be Al-Minaa's 42nd season in the Iraqi Premier League, having featured in all 44 editions of the competition except two. Al-Minaa are participating in the Iraqi Premier League and the Iraq FA Cup.

They enter this season having finished in a disappointing sixth place in the league in the 2016–17 season, and will be looking to wrestle back the title they won in the 1977–78 season.

Squad

Players data

Transfers

In

Out

Technical staff

Goalscorers

Last updated: 17 July 2018

Clean sheets

Last updated: 17 July 2018

Overall statistics

Last updated: 17 July 2018

Sources
 FIFA.COM 
 Iraqi League 2017/2018
 Al-Minaa SC: Transfers and News

References 

Al-Mina'a SC seasons
Al Mina